Buza can refer to:

Places
Buza, Iran
Buza, Poland
Buza, Cluj, a commune in Romania

Other uses
Boza, a beverage

See also
Boza (name)